Neil Abramson may refer to:
 Neil Abramson (politician) (born  1967), American politician
 Neil Abramson (filmmaker) (born 1963), American filmmaker